Dessie Hutchinson (born 5 December 1996) is an Irish hurler and former professional association footballer. He last played professional football as a midfielder or full-back for Waterford of the League of Ireland Premier Division. In 2020 he joined the Waterford county hurling team and was part of the team that reached the 2020 All-Ireland SHC Final.

Hutchinson was born in Dunmore East, County Waterford and played youth football with Waterford Bohemians and Brighton & Hove Albion, where he made his senior debut in the EFL Cup. In 2018 he joined hometown club Waterford, who play in the League of Ireland.

Early life 
Hutchinson was born in Ballygunner. He played both football and hurling as to a good level but decided to focus on football. He played his youth football in Ireland with Bohemians Waterford and was selected for the Waterford & District Junior League team which reached the final of 2012–13 FAI Youth-Inter League Cup. He was a hurler for his hometown club Ballygunner.

Association football career

Club career
Following his move to the club Hutchinson became an important member of the dressing room, sharing the under-23 captaincy for the 2016–17 season. During this season the side qualified for the knockout stages of the EFL Trophy. 
Hutchinson scored in the semi final of the Sussex Senior Challenge Cup, a 4–3 victory over Eastbourne Borough. He captained them to victory in the competition, seeing off Crawley Town in the final 3–0 after extra time. Hutchinson made his first team debut on 19 September 2017, playing 120 minutes of an EFL Cup game against Bournemouth, alongside fellow Irishman Jayson Molumby.

After leaving Brighton, Hutchinson signed for his hometown club Waterford who play in the League of Ireland Premier Division. He chose to sign for Waterford despite other offers from English clubs.

International career
Hutchinson made his Republic of Ireland under-19 debut against Sweden in October 2014. He scored his only goal at this level against Azerbaijan in a 6–0 victory on 25 February 2015. Hutchinson was called in to the next Irish under-21 squad meet-up in May 2017 but was not included in the next squad.

Hurling career
Hutchinson scored 4–27 for the Ballygunner club in the 2019 Waterford Senior Hurling Championship and 6–23 in the 2020 Waterford Senior Hurling Championship.

Hutchinson made his inter-county debut for Waterford in 2020. Waterford qualified for the 2020 All-Ireland Senior Hurling Championship Final in his debut season. Ahead of the final (with 2–8), Hutchinson was the competition's leading scorer from play. He was behind the Limerick and Waterford free takers, Aaron Gillane (2–34) and Stephen Bennett (1–44), ahead of the competition's concluding game.

Association football career statistics

Club

Honours

Association football
Brighton & Hove Albion
 Sussex Senior Challenge Cup: 2016–17

Hurling
Ballygunner
Waterford Senior Hurling Championship: 2019, 2020, 2021
Munster Senior Club Hurling Championship: 2021
 All Ireland Senior Club Hurling Championship: 2022

References

External links
 

1996 births
Living people
Republic of Ireland association footballers
Republic of Ireland youth international footballers
Association footballers from County Waterford
Association football midfielders
Brighton & Hove Albion F.C. players
Waterford F.C. players
Waterford inter-county hurlers
Ballygunner hurlers